The Molango mine is a mine located in the center of Mexico in Hidalgo. Molango represents one of the largest manganese reserve in Mexico having estimated reserves of 1.53 bmillion tonnes of manganese ore grading 25% manganese metal.

References 

Manganese mines in Mexico